Kenneth Ernest "Moco" Mercer (June 9, 1903 – February 19, 1970) was an American football player and coach of football and basketball. He played professionally in the National Football League (NFL) with the Frankford Yellow Jackets from 1927 to 1929. Mercer was the head football coach at the University of Dubuque from 1939 to 1961, compiling a record of 95–65–6. He was also the head basketball coach at Dubuque from 1940 to 1950, tallying a mark of 112–34.

Head coaching record

College football

References

External links
 
 

1903 births
1970 deaths
Basketball coaches from Iowa
Beloit Buccaneers football coaches
Dubuque Spartans athletic directors
Dubuque Spartans football coaches
Dubuque Spartans men's basketball coaches
Frankford Yellow Jackets players
Simpson Storm football coaches
Simpson Storm football players
High school football coaches in Iowa
People from Albia, Iowa
Players of American football from Iowa